Gaslight Square in St. Louis, Missouri, was an entertainment district located in an area close to the intersection of Olive and Boyle streets, near the eastern part of what is now known as the Central West End neighborhood and close to the current Grand Center arts and theater district and the adjoining Midtown neighborhood.

History
Gaslight Square was the name given to the entertainment district built in the mid-1950s. The district was known for its gas lit street lamps and ornate Victorian style architecture, reflective of the 1800s and the riverboat era around the turn of the century. Gaslight Square quickly became a thriving entertainment district that could be compared somewhat to the Delmar Loop area of St. Louis today. The square occupies the area surrounding Olive and Boyle streets in the Central West End. The district was popular for music, poetry, comedy, formal and informal dining, and dancing. It was the home to many clubs and restaurants, and entertainment venues.

Brothers Dick and Paul Mutrux are considered by many to be the pioneers of Gaslight Square, being proprietors of one of the first saloons in the area, the Gaslight. Another saloon, the Golden Eagle, soon opened, and proprietor Jay Landesman relocated his extremely popular cabaret theatre, the Crystal Palace, to the area as well. Early business owners in Gaslight Square raided recently demolished property in downtown St. Louis to salvage unique items such as church pews, chandeliers, recycled stained glass, and marble bathtubs. These resourceful decorations gave Gaslight Square a youthful, eclectic feel that attracted young beatniks and wealthy customers alike. At its height, Gaslight Square was home to approximately fifty businesses, including taverns, cabarets, restaurants, sidewalk cafes, and antique shops. These businesses provided an array of unique entertainment that combined elements of the past and present. The Opera House had a façade covered in croquet balls and was a venue for Dixieland jazz. The Roaring Twenties was a speakeasy themed bar that included a stage show, mock raids, and staged gangster fights. The Natchez Queen was decorated to resemble a riverboat with live ragtime music inside. Mr.D's, highlighted a piano bar featuring Ceil Clayton where many of the Gaslight musicians would come and sing along. By 1962, property values had tripled in Gaslight Square.

The district was greatly affected by dramatic change in culture and music of the late 1950s and '60s when the bohemian and later hippie generation began questioning traditional majority values in art, literature, and political self-expression. The district attracted many poets and writers, such as Jack Kerouac and Allen Ginsberg who would stop in St. Louis to experience Gaslight Square.

Many entertainers such as the Smothers Brothers, Lenny Bruce, Miles Davis, Barbra Streisand, Jackie Mason, Mike Nichols and Elaine May, Woody Allen, Jerry Stiller, Dick Gregory, and Jack E. Leonard gained exposure at the start of their careers in the clubs of Gaslight Square. Even rockers played Gaslight Square. Under the name Allman Joys, Gregg Allman and his brother, Duane, spent six months there in 1966 playing at Pepe's à Gogo.

Traditional jazz clubs in Gaslight Square included Peacock Alley and Opera House. Modern jazz clubs included the Dark Side. Rosalie Lovett's Left Bank featured barrelhouse bluesman James Crutchfield.

By the late 1960s, Gaslight Square had lost its luster, falling victim to the rapid growth of suburbs, urban decay, and "white flight" of that era.

Gaslight Square was the location of the studios of KDNA, an early community radio station with a countercultural ethos which played music, poetry and spoken word, interviewed musicians, poets, and artists, and ran anti-war and leftist political content. It was a predecessor to the community radio music station KDHX.

Today
Many of Gaslight Square's gas lamps were sold to Six Flags during the construction of Six Flags St. Louis in the late 1960s, for use in the park's Missouri section (now 1904 World's Fair). Most of them are still in use.

By the late 1990s, most of the buildings were long gone; those that remained stood open and rapidly deteriorating.
For the 20–30 years the district was almost completely vacant, with many empty lots and the remaining building dilapidated and empty.

In 2005, many properties within Gaslight Square were bought by the development company RJK Inc. 150 units were planned, mostly condominia. The new residential properties were meant to sell in the 280k-600k price-range. As of 2008, the vacant lots and condemned buildings are no more. The district is a mixed density residential community with new single family, row homes, small apartments, and condos.

Some of the significant architectural elements from Gaslight Square were preserved by the National Building Arts Center in the Metro East area of Greater St. Louis.

William Roth, actor and entrepreneur, keeps Gaslight Square alive with his Gaslight Theater (gaslighttheater.net - home of his St. Louis Actors' Studio (stlas.org)) and adjacent eatery, The West End Grill and Pub just down the street on Boyle.

There is a small memorial at the intersection of Olive and Boyle featuring some decorative columns like those that used to be on the street and a wall with a stone plaque with names of people and establishments from Gaslight Square's past topped with a few sections of modest cornices of former buildings from the district.

Media
During the area's heyday, a 1962 episode of the American TV drama Route 66 was set and filmed inside The Darkside jazz club in Gaslight Square. The episode was entitled "Hey Moth, Come Eat the Flame".

Two documentaries were produced about Gaslight Square in the early 2000s. Gaslight Square: The Forgotten Landmark (Bruce Marren/2002) explores the history by the people who developed the area. It includes interviews with the Smothers Brothers, Jay Landesman, Bob Kuban, and many others.

Gaslight Square: The Legend Lives On (Bruce Marren/2005) looks at the influence it had on the city, uncovers relics, and what has happened to it today. It includes interviews with Phyllis Diller, Billy Peek, Jonnie King, and many others.

See also
 Laclede Gas Company, the local utility company, founded as a provider of gas light
 Streetcars in St. Louis, streetcar service ran through Gaslight Square

References

External links
 Gaslight Square.Org
 Central West End Landmark
 
 KETC Living St. Louis Gaslight Square a video piece about Gaslight Square assembled by local PBS station KETC

History of St. Louis